Thomas Morrison (born 6 March 1943) is a Scottish former footballer who played in Scotland, England and Ireland for Aberdeen, Port Vale, and Sligo Rovers.

Career
Morrison started his career at First Division side Aberdeen, helping Tommy Pearson's "Dons" to 9th and 12th-place finishes in 1963–64 and 1964–65. He moved to England to join Port Vale in July 1965, who were then managed by fellow Scot Jackie Mudie. He played five Fourth Division and one League Cup games, scoring one goal in 2–2 draw with Barrow at Holker Street, in 1965–66, before being transferred to Sligo Rovers in January 1966. Morrison scored on his League of Ireland debut, and scored a total of three goals in 16 appearances for Sligo.

Career statistics
Source:

References

1943 births
Living people
People from Croy
Scottish footballers
Association football forwards
Aberdeen F.C. players
Port Vale F.C. players
Scottish expatriate footballers
Expatriate association footballers in the Republic of Ireland
Sligo Rovers F.C. players
Scottish Football League players
English Football League players
League of Ireland players